

Military monuments and memorials
Triumphal Arch
Tomb of the Unknown Soldier

Monuments and memorials to childhood
Children Are the Victims of Adult Vices

Monuments and memorials to labor
Worker and Kolkhoz Woman

Monuments and memorials to peace
We demand peace!

Monuments and memorials to people

Discoverers
Cosmonauts Alley
Monument to Yuri Gagarin

Militaries
Monument to Fyodor Tolbukhin

Musicians
Monument to Sergei Rachmaninov

Politicians
Alley of the rulers of Russia
Monument to Yuriy Dolgorukiy
Monument to Vladimir the Great
Monument to Robespierre (destroyed)
Monument to Minin and Pozharsky
Monument to Peter the Great
Monument to Alexander II
Monument to Lenin (Kaluga Square)
Monument to Ho Chi Minh

Philosophers
Monument to Friedrich Engels

Writers
Monuments to Herzen and Ogaryov
Monument to Leo Tolstoy (Prechistenka Street)

Monuments and memorials to science
Monument to the Conquerors of Space

Monuments and memorials to victims of political repressions
Solovetsky Stone
Wall of Grief

Monuments and memorials

Moscow
Moscow